Google Browser Sync was a Mozilla Firefox extension released as freeware from Google. It debuted in Google Labs on 8 June 2006, and in June 2008 was discontinued. It allowed users of Mozilla Firefox up to versions 2.x to synchronize their web browser settings across multiple computers via the Internet.

Google Browser Sync required a Google account, in which the user's cookies, saved passwords, bookmarks, browsing history, tabs, and open windows could be stored. The data was optionally encrypted using an alphanumerical PIN, which theoretically prevented even Google from reading the data. Passwords and cookies were always encrypted and could only be accessed by the user.

Google Browser Sync technology was integrated into Google Chrome.

See also
Firefox Sync
Comparison of browser synchronizers

References

External links
Firefox extension (google-browsersync.xpi)
Google Browser Sync source code
Google Firefox Extensions Discussion Group

2006 software
Browser Sync
Free Firefox legacy extensions